is an erotic simulation game by Kōei,
released for the PC-8801 computer in April 1982. 

It was one of the earliest commercial Japanese erotic computer games, featuring sexually explicit images, and a precursor to the modern eroge genre. Night Life was marketed as an aid for the sex life of couples. It included such features as a schedule to determine a woman's period, and a catalog of possible sexual positions, with artwork consisting of black-and-white outlines.

The PC-8801 version got an English translation patch on May 19, 2022.

References 

1982 video games
Eroge
Koei games
NEC PC-8001 games
NEC PC-8801 games
FM-7 games
Video games developed in Japan